Incognito Entertainment (formerly Incognito Studios and Incog Inc. Entertainment) was an American video game developer headquartered  in Salt Lake City.

History 
Incognito Entertainment was founded in 1999 by Scott Campbell, who had previously led the development of Rogue Trip (1998) for SingleTrac. In January 2000, the company signed a publishing agreement with a "major North American publisher". The studio was originally known as Incognito Studios and later renamed Incog Inc. Entertainment. Sony acquired Incog Inc. Entertainment in August 2002 and made it an internal studio of Sony Computer Entertainment America (SCEA). At the time, studio employed 51 people.

Campbell and David Jaffe, alongside the majority of the company's staff, left Incognito Entertainment in July 2007 to form Eat Sleep Play, an independent studio backed by SCEA. The remainder of Incognito Entertainment was led by Dylan Jobe and maintained the PlayStation 3 game Warhawk. In March 2009, he and several other staff members left the studio to establish LightBox Interactive.

Games developed

References

External links 
 

1999 establishments in Utah
2002 mergers and acquisitions
2009 disestablishments in Utah
American companies disestablished in 2009
American companies established in 1999
Companies based in Salt Lake City
Defunct companies based in Utah
Defunct video game companies of the United States
PlayStation Studios
Video game companies based in Utah
Video game companies disestablished in 2009
Video game companies established in 1999
Video game development companies